Murugesan may refer to:

K. Murugesan Anandan, member of the 15th Lok Sabha of India
Murugesan Kulasegaran (born 1957), Malaysian politician and barrister
Murugesan Mahendran (born 1947), Malaysian field hockey player
A. Nanjil Murugesan, Indian politician
Arun Murugesan, Indian Weightlifter
D. Murugesan, Indian politician
D Murugesan, former Chief Justice of Delhi High Court
Meesai Murugesan (1930–2014), veteran actor and musician in Tamil films
P. Murugesan, politician
Parasurama Naidu Murugesan, former Flag Officer of the Indian Navy
Rajesh Murugesan (born 1988), Indian music composer including Malayalam cinema
S. Murugesan, Indian politician and former Member of Parliament
Shurentheran Murugesan (born 1956), Malaysian field hockey player
Vasuki Murugesan, politician
T. S. Murugesan Pillai (1870–1930), Telugu writer, poet and translator
Murugesan Sinnandavar (born 1967), social activist in Selangor, Malaysia
Ranjeet Virali-Murugesan (born 1985), Indian tennis player

See also
Vedigundu Murugesan (transl. Bomb Murugesan), a 2009 Tamil-language comedy film
Margeson
Margesson
Margison